Sander Kaasjager (born 21 June 1985), who plays under the pseudonym Vo0, is a Dutch professional player of the first-person shooter games Painkiller, Quake II, Quake III , Quake 4, Quake Live and Quake Champions, and also World of Warcraft. He has won more titles and prize money—over US$250,000—at professional Painkiller tournaments than any other player.

Career
Originally starting with Quake II, Kaasjager later rose to widespread popularity with the release of a self-made highlight montage (or "frag video") from the game Challenge ProMode Arena, which showcases his unique aggressive style of playing.

Kaasjager played Painkiller for esports team Fnatic. Kaasjager won two world championship titles in 2004, one with CPL and one with ESWC,. In 2005, Kaasjager competed in the 2005 CPL World Tour, in which he won at five out of nine stops and earned $223,000. Kaasjager was named the Most Valuable Player of the tour. He played in the finals of the CPL World Tour against Fatal1ty but ended up losing.

When the Cyberathlete Professional League, World Series of Video Games, and other tournaments dropped Painkiller in favor of Quake 4, Kaasjager took a break from professional gaming starting from June 21, 2006, to pursue his studies for the upcoming college semester. He made a comeback to competitive gaming on April 30, 2007, participating in the World of Warcraft competition of the World Series of Video Games representing Fnatic once again.

After retiring, he has been known to play Challenge ProMode Arena, Warsow, QuakeWorld, Quake Live, and evading Thunderfury binding drops.

In 2017, at age 32, Kaasjager returned from retirement and finished in second place at the Quake World Championship 2017.

Tournament placings

2004
 1st – CPL Extreme Summer Championships 2004 – 1on1 (Dallas, U.S.)
 1st – CPL Extreme Winter Championships 2004 – 1on1 (Dallas, U.S.)
 1st – Electronic Sports World Cup 2004 – 1on1 (Poitiers, France)
 1st – Netgamez 2004B – 1on1 (Nieuwegein, Netherlands)

2005
 2nd – CPL World Tour Grand Finals – 1on1 (New York City)
 3rd – CPL World Tour Stop Chile 2005 – 1on1 (Santiago, Chile)
 1st – CPL World Tour Stop Italy 2005 – 1on1 (Milan, Italy)
 2nd – CPL World Tour Stop Singapore 2005 – 1on1 (Singapore)
 1st – CPL World Tour Stop UK 2005 – 1on1 (Sheffield)
 2nd – CPL World Tour Stop USA 2005 – 1on1 (Dallas)
 1st – CPL World Tour Stop Sweden 2005 – 1on1 (Jönköping)
 1st – CPL World Tour Stop Brazil 2005 – 1on1 (Rio de Janeiro, Brazil)
 2nd – CPL World Tour Stop Spain 2005 – 1on1 (Barcelona)
 1st – CPL World Tour Stop Turkey 2005 – 1on1 (Istanbul)
 1st – CPL World Tour Spain Qualifier 2005 – 1on1 (Istanbul)

2007
 2nd – World Series of Video Games, China – 3on3 (Wuhan, China)

2008
 7th – QuakeCon 2008 Intel Quake Live 1v1 Championship – 1on1 (Dallas, Texas, USA)
 8th – GameGune 2008 – 1on1 (Bilbao, Spain)
 13th – Electronic Sports World Cup Masters of Paris– 1on1 (Paris, France)
 2nd – Electronic Sports World Cup qualifier – 1on1 (Enschede, Netherlands)

2009
 4th – Intel Extreme Masters Season IV American Championship finals, Quake Live – 1on1 (Edmonton, Alberta, Canada)
 1st – Dreamhack Summer CPM, Quake III Championship – 1on1 (Jönköping, Sweden)

2017
 2nd – Quake World Championship 2017: Duel Tournament finals, Quake Champions – 1on1 (Dallas, USA)

Awards
 Most Valuable Player CPL World Tour 2005
 (ESports Award) Newcomer / Breakthrough of the Year 2005

Personal life
Kaasjager was born in Naarden, Netherlands on June 21, 1985. He enrolled in Delft as a student of mechanical engineering but dropped out to focus on gaming. He attended the University of Texas at Dallas and is a member of the UTD Comets men's tennis team. Vo0 has a Bachelor of Science degree in mechanical engineering.

References

External links
 Team Fnatic

Living people
1985 births
Quake (series) players
Painkiller players
World of Warcraft players
Dutch esports players
People from Naarden
University of Texas at Dallas alumni
Delft University of Technology alumni
Fnatic players
CompLexity Gaming players